Walking Out is a 2017 American survival drama film directed by Alex & Andrew J. Smith, starring Matt Bomer, and based on a short story of the same name by David Quammen. It was screened in the U.S. Dramatic Competition section of the 2017 Sundance Film Festival. It was executive produced by Rodrigo Garcia, and it was released on October 6, 2017 by IFC Films. It was filmed on location in Livingston, Paradise Valley, and Bozeman, Montana. The film received critical acclaim.

Plot
Once a year, David flies to Montana from Texas while on school break. David lives with his mother and makes one annual visit to see his father Cal, an avid outdoorsman. David is most used to the city life and has a firm attachment to his smartphone, with which he incessantly plays games and texts his mom. Father and son have a rather estranged relationship. David barely looks up from his phone when his dad arrives at the airport to pick him up. Neither seems excited to see the other and Cal makes it clear that he wants David to participate in outdoor activities. He's stern with David, but they each handle the other with restraint. David would rather not go pheasant-hunting but agrees to join his old man. Cal takes it one step further and asks him if he'd like to go on a moose-hunting expedition in the snow-peaked mountains. David is reluctant but also feels obligated to make the trek. High up in the mountains Cal is accidentally shot in the leg and it is up to David to get them both out. David carries his father on his back down the mountain, taking breaks to tend to his father. Though he loses his way, he finds a remote house, where he and his father receive care. A doctor arrives, informing David that Cal died, likely at some point the previous morning. David responds "I know", indicating he was aware that his father was dead while he carried him down the mountain.

Cast
 Matt Bomer as Cal
 Alex Neustaedter as Young Cal
 Bill Pullman as Clyde
 Chaske Spencer as Sun Bear
 Josh Wiggins as David
 Lily Gladstone as Lila

Critical reception
On review aggregator website Rotten Tomatoes, the film holds an approval rating of 90% based on 49 reviews, and an average rating of 7.1/10. The website's critical consensus reads, "Beautifully filmed and powerfully acted, Walking Out effectively balances tense father-son drama against an affecting wilderness survival story." On Metacritic, the film has a weighted average score of 79 out of 100, based on 13 critics, indicating "generally favorable reviews".

References

External links
 
 

2017 films
2017 drama films
2010s survival films
American drama films
American survival films
Films about father–son relationships
Films about death
Films about hunters
Films set in Montana
Films shot in Montana
2010s English-language films
2010s American films